The World class is a class of cruise ships being built by Chantiers de l'Atlantique of France for MSC Cruises. There are four vessels planned, with the lead vessel, under construction and set to be delivered in 2022.

History

Planning 
In April 2016, MSC Cruises unveiled a new class of cruise ships that it calls the World class after it signed a letter of intent for up to four World-class vessels from STX France, an order worth approximately €4.5 billion, at Élysée Palace. The announcement came after MSC revealed it had already finalized the order for two of the ships. MSC also announced all ships in the class would be powered by liquefied natural gas (LNG).

Timeline 
The ships were originally expected to be delivered in 2022, 2024, 2025, and 2026, respectively. The contract for the final two ships, now set to be delivered in 2025 and 2027, respectively, was signed in January 2020.

On 31 October 2019, MSC announced the name of the first World-class ship as MSC Europa and held the ship's steel-cutting ceremony at Chantiers de l'Atlantique, inaugurating the construction for the ship. The ship was later revealed to be renamed MSC World Europa, announced during her keel-laying ceremony on 29 June 2020.

Design and specifications 
In May 2017, at the delivery ceremony of  held at the STX France shipyard in Saint-Nazaire, France, MSC Cruises released new details and renderings of the class of ships. In the announcement, MSC revealed that each of the four ships it had ordered would hold a guest capacity of 6,850 passengers across 2,760 passenger cabins, more than any cruise ship. Initial features announced included square cabins, a glass pool lounge, and sections designed specifically for families. The aft of the ships would also be open, with the lower promenade deck flanked by balcony cabin towers.

As all ships are designed to be powered by LNG, this would reportedly allow them to sail with a 99% decrease in sulfur dioxide emissions, an 85% decrease in nitric oxide emissions, and a 20% decrease in carbon dioxide emissions, when compared with non-LNG-powered ships. MSC World Europa will also become the world's first ship to implement an LNG-powered fuel cell. The 50-kilowatt fuel cell demonstrator aboard the ship will incorporate solid oxide fuel cell (SOFC) technology and use LNG to produce onboard electricity and heat and reportedly further reduce greenhouse gas emissions by 30% compared with conventional LNG engines.

Ships

References

World-class Cruise Ship
Ships built by Chantiers de l'Atlantique
Ships built in France
Ships of MSC Cruises